The McCormick Manufacturing Company Building is a historic structure located in Dayton, Ohio, USA. It was added to the National Register of Historic Places on February 2, 2001.

See also
National Register of Historic Places listings in Dayton, Ohio

References

National Register of Historic Places in Montgomery County, Ohio
Industrial buildings and structures on the National Register of Historic Places in Ohio
Buildings and structures in Dayton, Ohio